National Golf Resort Golf Club is a golf club and course on the bank of the Danė river in Stančiai, Klaipėda District Municipality.

In 2015 Golf Club will host European Amateurs Team Championships

References

External links 
 

2006 establishments in Lithuania
Golf clubs and courses in Lithuania